Eudokia Angelina (or Eudocia Angelina) (around 1173–died , or later) was the consort of Stefan the First-Crowned of Serbia from c. 1190 to c. 1200. She later remarried, to Alexios V Doukas, who briefly ruled as Emperor of Byzantium in 1204. She was a daughter of Alexios III Angelos and Euphrosyne Doukaina Kamatera.

Life
Eudokia first married Stefan, the second son of Stefan Nemanja, Grand Župan of Serbia. The marriage was arranged by her uncle, the emperor Isaac II Angelos, around 1190, while her father was in exile in Syria. In 1196, on her father-in-law's retirement to a monastery, Eudokia's husband became ruler of Serbia. According to the Byzantine historian Nicetas Choniates, Stefan and Eudokia quarrelled and separated, accusing one another of adultery, and therefore in 1200 or 1201, Eudokia was banished from Serbia. Eudokia fled on foot with only the clothes on her back, seeking refuge at the court of Stefan's brother Vukan, ruler of Zeta, who befriended her and provided for. When she recovered, Eudokia went to Dyrrachium, from where a Byzantine ship returned her to her father in Constantinople. The repudiation of Eudokia shows the decline of Byzantine power and prestige.

In Constantinople Eudokia became the mistress of the future Alexios V Doukas, with whom she (and her mother) fled the city into Thrace on April 12, 1204, as the Crusaders of the Fourth Crusade were storming the city. Reaching her deposed father at Mosynopolis, Eudocia was allowed to marry Alexios V, but he was arrested and mutilated on the orders of Alexios III. Eudokia was furious with her father's actions. Afterwards Alexios without any supporters, was captured and sentenced to death by the Crusaders.

Eudokia married thirdly Leo Sgouros, the independent ruler of Corinth, after he offered asylum to Alexios III and his family in 1204. Blockaded in the citadel of Corinth, Leo Sgouros committed suicide in 1207/1208. Eudokia is thought to have died around 1211.

By her marriage to Stefan of Serbia she had four children:
 Stefan Radoslav, King of Serbia (1228-1234)
 Stefan Vladislav, King of Serbia from 1234 to 1243
 Sava II, Archbishop of the Serbian Orthodox Church, serving from 1263 until his death in 1271
 Komnena Nemanjić

See also

List of Byzantine emperors
List of Roman and Byzantine Empresses

Notes

Sources
 
 
 
 
O city of Byzantium: annals of Niketas Choniates tr. Harry J. Magoulias (Detroit: Wayne State University Press, 1984).

|-

1170s births
1210s deaths
Year of birth uncertain
Year of death uncertain
Date of death unknown
Eudokia
Medieval Serbian royal consorts
Christians of the Fourth Crusade
Medieval Serbian people of Greek descent
Remarried royal consorts
12th-century Byzantine women
13th-century Byzantine empresses
Daughters of Byzantine emperors